Sedlari may refer to:

Bosnia-Herzegovina
Sedlari (Goražde), a village in Goražde, Podrinje, Federation of Bosnia and Herzegovina
Sedlari (Trebinje), a locality situated in Trebinje, Serb Republic of Bosnia

Bulgaria
Sedlari, Bulgaria, a village located in Momčilgrad, Kardzhali Province

Serbia
Sedlari (Valjevo), a locality in Valjevo, near Kolubara river